Anisota stigma, the spiny oakworm moth, is a moth of the family Saturniidae. The species was first described by Johan Christian Fabricius in 1775. It is found in North America from Massachusetts and southern Ontario to Florida, west to Minnesota, Kansas and Texas.

The larvae mainly feed on oak, but have also been reported on hazel and basswood. Anisota stigma is the only Anisota species with males known to be attracted to light.

References

External links

Ceratocampinae
Moths described in 1775
Moths of North America
Taxa named by Johan Christian Fabricius